Ammerbuch is a municipality in the district of Tübingen, in Baden-Württemberg, Germany. It is situated 7 km northwest of Tübingen.

Geographical location
The municipality Ammerbuch is 345–551 meters above sea level in part on the edge of the Schönbuch nature park, and partly in the valley of Ammer in the northern Gäu.

Geology
Ammerbuch is located in the Gäu, which is dominated by keuper, gypsum and sandstone layers.
Since 1750, limestone was mined in Reusten, the last quarry was closed in 1970. In Breitenholz, Entringen, Poltringen and Altingen gypsum was mined, but now only the gypsum quarry in Altingen is in operation. In the northern Schönbuch, but also in Breitenholz sandstone was broken since 1383.

Neighboring communities
The following cities and towns bordering the municipality Ammerbuch, they are in a clockwise direction starting called the north and part of the district of Tübingen¹ or the Böblingen²: Herrenberg², Altdorf², Tübingen¹, Rottenburg am Neckar¹ and Gäufelden².

Municipality arrangement
The municipality Ammerbuch consists of the six districts (Teilorte):
 Altingen (8.58 km²; 2549 inhabitants in March 2015, 
 Breitenholz (10.82 km²; 768)
 Entringen (13.94 km²; 3700)
 Pfäffingen (3, 70 km²; 1811)
 Poltringen (4.84 km²; 1742)
 Reusten (6.11 km²; 973).

Except for the districts Entringen and Pfäffingen, the districts are villages (Ortschaften) according to the  municipal code of Baden-Württemberg, which each have a local council and a mayor as its chairman. The castle Hohenentringen belongs to the district Entringen.

Climate
Ammerbuch is dominated by pleasantly mild climate, in some places part-time winemakers grow grapes. Ammerbuch is located near the earthquake zone of the Hohenzollerngraben (Hohenzollern-trench).

History
The oldest evidence of a settlement in the Ammer Valley goes back to the Neolithic period. Tools, huts and tombs have been found on the Kirchberg in Reusten, and their age is estimated to be about 6,000 years.

In Pfäffingen, Entringen and Poltringen there are foundations of Roman estates. A Roman road, which was later known as King Street or Ammer Valley road, led from Sumelocenna (today Rottenburg am Neckar) via Unterjesingen, Poltringen, Reusten and Altingen to Herrenberg and continued to Portus (today Pforzheim). From 84–260 after Christ the Ammer Valley was dominated by the Romans before they were ousted by the Alemanni.

In the 3rd century, Alemanni originating from northern Germany settled in the Ammertal and on the Schönbuch slopes. Probably in the 5th or 6th century the six villages arose that now form Ammerbuch. The County Palatine of Tübingen sold their possession in 1293 to the Bebenhausen monastery. Their seat was the Roseck Castle, above Unterjesingen at the edge of the Schönbuch.

After the dissolution of the monastery Bebenhausen 1534/35 the villages came for the most part to the Duchy of Württemberg and became Protestant. In 1699 Pfäffingen came to Württemberg, the half of Altingen, two-thirds of Poltringen and part of Reusten came in Austrian possession and were partly Catholic as part of Further Austria.

1806 Napoleon I. rewarded Württemberg for his allegiance. The further Austrian parts around Rottenburg fell to Württemberg. The villages were administered since 1808 by the Oberamt Herrenberg. In the reorganization by the Nazis in 1938, they fell to the district of Tübingen.

Ammerbuch was founded on 1 December 1971 in the context of the local government reform by the merger of the municipalities Altingen, Breitenholz, Entringen, Pfäffingen, Poltringen and Reusten.

Name
The name Ammerbuch has not grown historically. It is an artificial word that refers to the scenic location between Ammer Valley and Schönbuch.

Council
Local elections in 2014:

Turnout: 57.3%
In the municipal elections on 25 May 2014, following allocation of seats resulted:
GAL: 6 seats
CDU : 6 seats
FWV : 4 seats
BWV : 3 seats
SPD : 2 seats
There is also a youth council in Ammerbuch since 2011.

Mayor
In the mayoral election on 16 February 2014, the former councilor Christel Halm (CDU) continued through with 50.9% in the second ballot against four competitors. In the first round on 2 February 2014, she had led with 39.7% well ahead of Andreas Steinacker (GAL) with 29.4%.  She has assumed the post on 1 April 2014 and is the first woman in this office.
On July 22, 2013, the predecessor Friedrich von Ow-Wachendorf informed the council that he would retire 31 March 2014 for personal reasons from his office. 
1971-2001: Hugo Dieter
2001-31. March 2014: Friedrich von Ow-Wachendorf (CDU)
since April 1, 2014: Christel Halm (CDU)

Former Crest
The municipal coat of arms shows in gold (yellow) a rooted green beech, covered with a lowered blue wave beam.
The tree symbolizes the Schönbuch, the blue wave beam the Ammer. The six aspiring branches and six indigenous roots of beech represent the six villages that form village Ammerbuch today.

Culture and sights

Buildings
Castle Hohenentringen above Entringen from the 15th and 16th centuries (car access only via Hagelloch)
Michael Church in Entringen
Water Castle and mill in Poltringen, only to be viewed from the outside
St. Stephenanus Church in Poltringen
Overgrown ruins of the castle Müneck above Breitenholz
Overgrown ruins of the castle Kräheneck on the Kirchberg in Reusten

Museums
Kunstmuseum Manfred Luz in Ammerbuch-Entringen
Museum Anthon, art in small picture format in Ammerbuch-Breitenholz

Parks
Schönbuch Nature Park

Transportation

The Bundesstraße 28 connects the town to the west with Herrenberg, and then to the A81 and to the east with Tübingen, Reutlingen and Ulm. From this the provincial road 359 branches off in Pfäffingen, which passes through Pfäffingen, Poltringen, Reusten and Altingen.

The Ammer Valley Railway runs from Tübingen to Herrenberg through the municipality with breakpoints in Pfäffingen, Entringen and Altingen. In Herrenberg it provides connections to the Stuttgart–Horb railway. In Tübingen it provides connections to Reutlingen, Metzingen and Nürtingen, Wendlingen and Stuttgart or to Rottenburg and Hechingen). The Ammertalbahn drove 1910 for the first time. In 1966, it was shut down. In 1999 the operation was resumed.

The Public transport is guaranteed by the transport association naldo (Vehrsverbund Neckar-Alb-Donau). The community is located in the comb 110. The district Altingen is on the comb boundary 110/501, the district Pfäffingen on the comb boundary 110/111.

North of Poltringen is the air field of the Air Sports Association Ammerbuch.

Media
The press landscape Ammerbuch is mainly characterized by two daily newspapers. The Schwäbisches Tagblatt comes from Tübingen and is the most common daily newspaper. The Gäubote from Herrenberg is the second sheet in place. The official journal of the municipality is Ammerbuch Aktuell, which appears weekly on Thursday.

Education
Ammerbuch has in each of the six districts a primary school. In addition, a community school is in Altingen. More schools can be found in Herrenberg, Rottenburg and Tübingen.

Personalities

Sons and daughters of Ammerbuch
Adalbert of Entringen (11th and 12th century), nobleman
Beringer of Entringen (died 1232), bishop of Speyer 1224-1232.
Eberhard von Entringen to 1247 dean and canon in Strasbourg
Ritter Hugo von Müneck, ministerial of Count Rudolf of Tübingen, the son of a County Palatine of Tübingen.
Heinrich von Müneck, around 1286 Squire (servus nobilis) and from 1295 knight made by those of Hailfingen at the castle Müneck .
Konrad von Hailfingen called Poltringer (died 1427), who sold 1423 castle and village Poltringen, was in 1423 and 1426 Württembergian bailiff in Riquewihr.
Adolf Bauser (1880–1948), politician, (Reich Party for Civil Rights and Deflation), Member of Reichstag, Member of Parliament (Württemberg), born in the district Entringen
Hubert Lanz (1896–1982), general of the mountain troops in the Wehrmacht and war criminal, born in the district Entringen
Eckhart Dietz (born 1933), sculptor, born in the district Pfäffingen
Roland Asch (born 1950), Race Driver DTM (1985–1994), Porsche 944 Cup, Porsche Carrera Supercup, born in the district Altingen
Kim Kulig (born 1990), football player

Literature

Roland Fakler: Bilderbuch Ammerbuch – mit Texten, Bildern und Karten, Ammerbuch 2002
 Hans Anthon Wagner, Wolfgang Wulz: Schwäbische Ortsnecknamen – Von Leuten, die mit Gold düngen, Breitenholzer Igelverlag, Ammerbuch 1996, .
 Hans Anthon: Schäferkarren-Philosophie – Gedichte und Geschichten des Einsiedlers vom Schönbuch , Breitenholzer Igelverlag, Ammerbuch 2005, .

See also
 Entringen (district of Ammerbuch)

References

Tübingen (district)